Thottam Rajasekharan (born 24 September 1930) is an Indian writer.

Major works 

 Mukhammoodikal -1954 (Drama) 
 Thrishna – 1967 (Novel) 
 Nandu – 1972
 Cinema Midhayayum Sathyavum – 1981
 Udyogaparvam – 1991 (Service Story)
 Bodhi – 1991 (novel)
 Somatheeram – 2008 (Novel)
 Sivagiri Samaram oru Seshapatram – 2007 
 Cinema Kalayum Jevithavum – 2010
 Utharakandom – 2011 (Service Story)
 Narayana Guru Nayakan

See also
 Kerala Sahitya Akademi Award for Miscellaneous Works

References

External links
 http://www.thehindu.com/todays-paper/tp-national/tp-kerala/on-the-luring-world-of-cinema/article2816651.ece
 http://www.leadersyellowpages.com/phonenumbers/india/thiruvananthapuram/thottam+rajasekharan/LYP103-1-22787.html
 http://www.sngcollege.org/snms/devotes.php
 

1930 births
Living people